The  is a university museum affiliated with Tohoku University in Sendai, Miyagi Prefecture, Japan. From the collection of over 2,000,000 items, including rocks, minerals, fossils, archaeological materials, and maps, approximately 1,000 are on display at any one time.

Publications
 Bulletin of the Tohoku University Museum (2001–; vols. 1–)

See also
 Botanical Garden of Tohoku University
 Tōhoku History Museum

References

External links
 Tohoku University Museum

Sendai
Museums established in 1995
1995 establishments in Japan
University museums in Japan